= AsterRIDE =

asterRIDE
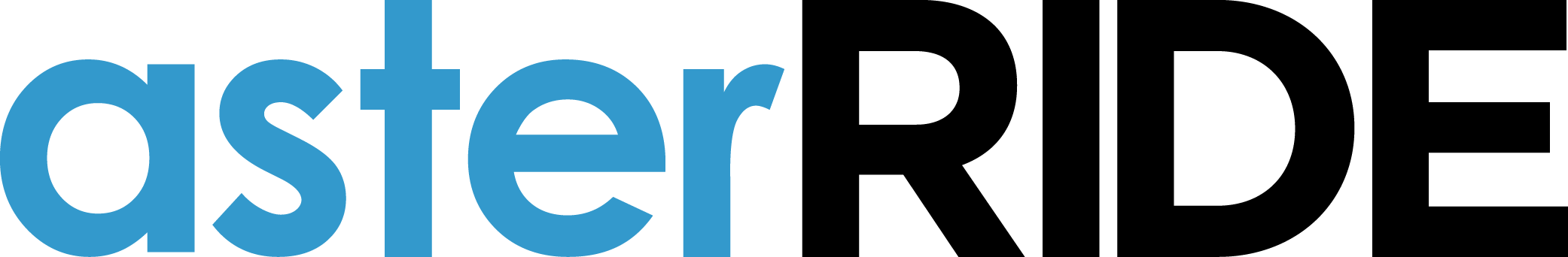
- asterRIDE's logo
- Industry: Transport
- Founded: 2014
- Founder: Seth Rudin
- Headquarters: Las Vegas, Nevada, United States
- Services: Taxi, limousine, chauffeur
- Website: www.asterride.com

asterRIDE is a referral company that operates and markets transportation services on behalf of limousine and taxi operators across the cities where they operate. AsterRIDE markets their web platform and mobile app asterRIDE (iOS and Android), which connects passengers with taxi drivers. As of June, 2015, asterRIDE was available in ten U.S. cities and growing: Chicago, Everett, Fort Lauderdale, Los Angeles, Miami, Naples, Orlando, Phoenix, San Diego, San Francisco, Seattle, and West Palm Beach. According to a release on their website, Las Vegas, New York City, Houston, and Philadelphia were to be added.

== History ==
asterRIDE was founded by Seattle entrepreneur and Arizona State University graduate Seth Rudin in October 2014. Rudin came up with the idea for the service while struggling to book ground transportation during his frequent business trips.

== AsterRIDE app and services ==
The asterRIDE passenger app connects passengers with commercially insured, city-licensed drivers. Vehicle drivers and cab companies receive and manage ride requests through a corresponding driver app. Passengers are offered a choice between a conventional taxi, for-hire car or limousine. Passengers can order rides immediately or for a future time, save favorite locations, and search recommendations through Yelp ratings.

=== InstaALERT ===
asterRIDE offers a safety feature called instaALERT, which allows passengers to send an alert to a friend or family member when they have accepted a ride via the app.

=== Preferred Driver ===
Passengers can select their preferred driver, and a driver can also invite new passengers to the platform whom want to be paired together.

=== Pricing model ===
asterRIDE passengers are charged a booking and customer service fee. The app does not use a "surge" pricing system.

== Reception ==
asterRIDE has been positively received by bloggers and media outlets. In December 2014, asterRIDE was named one of the 30 Must-Know Upstarts of 2014 by Upstart Business Journal. In May 2015, asterRIDE was named to Entrepreneur Magazine's list of 100 Brilliant Companies of 2015. It has been described as a taxi-friendly alternative to ride-sharing services like Uber and Lyft.
